The Town River is a river in Plymouth County, Massachusetts, United States. It flows  from the northeast end of Lake Nippenicket in the town of Bridgewater, flowing easterly through West Bridgewater, then south back into Bridgewater where it joins with the Matfield River to form the Taunton River.

Tributaries
Lake Nippenicket
Hockomock Swamp
Hockomock River
Onemile Brook
Meadow Brook
South Brook

Crossings
In West Bridgewater
Route 24
Scotland Street
Forest Street
South Street
Arch
South Main Street (Route 28)

In Bridgewater
High Street
Oak Street
Railroad
Broad Street (Route 18)
Hayward Street

See also
Bridgewater Iron Works

References

Rivers of Plymouth County, Massachusetts
Taunton River watershed
Rivers of Massachusetts